Ken Drury (born 7 June 1950) is a Scottish actor.

Career
Drury's career in TV has seen him play the midwife in Only Fools and Horses and Harry McNish, the carpenter of Ernest Shackleton in Shackleton opposite Kenneth Branagh.

References

External links

1950 births
Living people